The Melkus PT 73 Spyder was a prototype racing car built by Melkus in 1973. It consisted of a new, open chassis for the Melkus RS 1000. The design was inspired by the Škoda Metalex. It used an 1100 cc, three cylinder, triple carburetor two-stroke Wartburg engine giving 110 hp.

References 

Sports cars
Rear mid-engine, rear-wheel-drive vehicles
Concept cars